Gyroporella is an extinct genus of green algae, placed either in the family Dasycladaceae or the family Triploporellaceae.

Fossil record
This genus is known in the fossil record from the Permian to the Triassic (from about 272.5 to 205.6 million years ago). Fossils of species within this genus have been found in Europe, Iran, Afghanistan, China, Malaysia and Tunisia.

References

Permian plants
Triassic plants
Fossil algae
Ulvophyceae
Ulvophyceae genera
Permian first appearances
Triassic extinctions